KGIA-LP (92.9 FM) was a low-power FM radio station that broadcast a Christian radio format. Licensed to Grand Island, in the U.S. state of Nebraska, it served the Grand Island-Kearney area. The station was owned by Grand Island Adventist Educational Radio. It was affiliated with Radio 74 Internationale, an international religious broadcasting network.

History
The Federal Communications Commission (FCC) issued a construction permit for the station on December 19, 2003. The station was assigned the KGIA-LP call sign on April 28, 2004, and received its license to cover on September 27, 2006.

The station's owners surrendered the license to the FCC on June 4, 2015, who cancelled it the same day.

References

External links

 

GIA-LP
Radio stations established in 2006
Defunct radio stations in the United States
Radio stations disestablished in 2015
Defunct religious radio stations in the United States
2006 establishments in Nebraska
2015 disestablishments in Nebraska
Defunct mass media in Nebraska
Grand Island, Nebraska
Radio 74 Internationale radio stations